The USC Beaufort Sand Sharks (also USCB Sand Sharks or South Carolina–Beaufort Sand Sharks) are the athletic teams that represent the University of South Carolina Beaufort, located in Beaufort, South Carolina, in intercollegiate sports at the Division II level of the National Collegiate Athletic Association (NCAA), competing both in the Peach Belt Conference and the NAIA's Continental Athletic Conference, formerly known as the Association of Independent Institutions (AII), for the 2022–23 academic year only, after which the Sand Sharks will continue their transition as members of the Peach Belt.

USC Beaufort competes in eleven intercollegiate varsity sports. Men's sports include baseball, cross country, golf, and indoor and outdoor track and field; while women's sports include cross country, golf, soccer, softball, and indoor and outdoor track and field.

Move to NCAA Division II 
On April 14, 2021, South Carolina–Beaufort reported that the NCAA Division II's Peach Belt Conference invited the Sand Sharks to join the conference in 2022 after applying for membership in and gaining acceptance into the NCAA. Also on that day, USCB planned to add men's and women's basketball as a condition of its NCAA and Peach Belt membership. The teams in that sport were intended to play their first season in 2023–24. By July 15, 2022, USCB was already accepted into the Continental Athletic Conference for its first year of provisional membership while still playing a Peach Belt schedule as part of the Sand Sharks' NAIA-NCAA dual membership, but will be ineligible for a Peach Belt or NCAA postseason during the three-year transition.

Conference affiliations 
NAIA
 Association of Independent Institutions (2007–2008)
 Sun Conference (2008–2022)
 Continental Athletic Conference (2022–2023)
NCAA
 Peach Belt Conference (2022–present)

Varsity teams

Facilities
Both the Sand Shark baseball and softball teams currently practice and play all home games at the City of Hardeeville's Recreation Complex (the Richard Gray Baseball Complex).

References

External links